Tortolano is an Italian surname. Notable people with the surname include:

Emiliano Tortolano (born 1990), Italian footballer
Joe Tortolano (born 1966), Scottish footballer

Italian-language surnames